Kate Silverton (born 4 August 1970) is an English journalist. She formerly worked as a broadcaster and newsreader for the BBC. Silverton was a regular presenter of BBC News at One and BBC Weekend News, as well as making occasional appearances on the BBC News Channel and BBC World News. In 2018 she participated in series 16 of BBC's Strictly Come Dancing, where she was paired with professional dancer Aljaž Škorjanec and finished in 8th place. As of 2022, Silverton is currently training to be a children's counsellor.

Early life and education 
Silverton was born in Waltham Abbey in Essex, England, the daughter of Terry Silverton, a black-cab driver-turned-registered hypnotherapist and Patricia Silverton. Silverton has two sisters, Claire and Amy. Silverton attended West Hatch High School in Chigwell, Essex, where she was a junior swimming champion. She also competed in the triathlon. She was a Girl Guide and gained the Queen's Guide Award.

Silverton graduated from St. Cuthbert's Society, a college at Durham University with a Bachelor of Science degree in Psychology, having previously studied Arabic and Middle Eastern history for a year.

Early career 
Silverton worked for a London-based bank before becoming a journalist. She trained with the BBC, working on Look North news before becoming a reporter and presenter at Tyne Tees Television.

She was a panellist on Channel 5's The Wright Stuff, and hosted ITV's The Psychic Show in 2002. She also featured on The Heaven and Earth Show, Big Strong Boys, and Weekend Breakfast on BBC Radio 5 Live, before joining BBC News.

In 2003, Silverton allegedly hit Rod Liddle, the former editor of BBC Radio 4's Today programme, during a pilot for a new political show. Liddle said: "I made a stupid comment about the disabled which Kate rightly took exception to."

BBC News

From 2005 until December 2007, Silverton was a presenter on BBC News 24 and also a regular relief presenter for BBC Breakfast.

In December 2007, she was named as the presenter of the BBC News 8 p.m. summary, a 90-second round-up of the news shown on BBC One, which she presented for two months. She presented the BBC News at One from February to August 2008, whilst main presenter Sophie Raworth was on maternity leave.

BBC Scotland apologised to viewers in August 2010, after Silverton swore at the end of a news bulletin on live television. Viewers in Scotland were the only ones who heard the words. A spokesman for BBC Scotland said: "Kate thought she was off-air at the time. The microphones hadn't been faded down and the mistake only went out in Scotland."

Silverton took maternity leave in October 2011, and returned to the News at One in April 2012. Until May 2012, she was the deputy presenter of the BBC News at One, presenting on Mondays and when main presenter Sophie Raworth was unavailable. Sian Williams later took over this role. Silverton returned to the deputy role in October 2013 to cover for Williams' leave. However, Williams later left the BBC so Silverton regained her role.

Other BBC projects 
On 1 April 2008, alongside the historian Dan Snow, she presented live coverage of the celebrations held at RAF Fairford for the 90th Birthday of the Royal Air Force. In 2008, Silverton joined the presenting team for Big Cat Diary on BBC One. She co-presented coverage of New Year Live aboard  in London on 31 December 2008 on BBC One with Nick Knowles.

In April 2009, she appeared as a mentor in the BBC Two series The Speaker, offering her advice on good storytelling and public speaking.

In May 2009, she presented a documentary called 10 Things You Need to Know About Sleep, which looked at different ways to deal with insomnia.

From 2010, she presented the Sunday morning show on BBC Radio 5 Live, running from 09:30 to 11:00.

In June 2012, Silverton interviewed Prince William, Duke of Cambridge, who called for a halt to the killing of rhinos for their horns in Africa. Silverton has also acted as a stand-in presenter for the Radio Four series Last Word.

Strictly Come Dancing 
Between 8 September and 18 November 2018, Silverton participated in the sixteenth series of Strictly Come Dancing with professional dance partner Aljaž Škorjanec. The couple were eliminated in Week 9 (Blackpool), losing a dance-off against Graeme Swann and his partner Oti Mabuse.

Notes
Red number indicates Kate & Aljaž were at the bottom of the leaderboard
 Alfonso Ribeiro filled in for Tonioli

Philip Hayton incident 
In September 2005, Silverton drew media attention when her BBC News 24 co-newsreader Philip Hayton, who had worked for the BBC for 37 years, resigned his position six months into a year's contract, citing issues of "incompatibility" with Silverton. The Daily Telegraph, without substantiation and quoting an unnamed 'insider', reported that Hayton turned to Silverton during a break and said "I don't like you".

The Daily Mirror quoted another BBC 'insider' as saying that Silverton is "...pushy beyond belief. Behind her big superficial smile she can be a really aggressive, manipulative monster who always gets what she wants." Hayton merely cited "incompatibility" with Silverton as his reason and when his managers refused to move Silverton to another time slot, he left. Silverton was in the peculiar position of having to go through the morning's paper review live on air the morning the story broke, avoiding any discussion of the story and chiding her new co-anchor when he looked to refer to it. Hayton said that he left the BBC "without bitterness or rancour".

However, several figures spoke up for Silverton. Jon Sopel, a fellow BBC News 24 presenter, who was Silverton's co-anchor at News 24 for several months, commented on the incident saying: "She's warm and friendly. With Kate, what you see is what you get – she's bright, lively, talented and vivacious. I like and trust her. Yes, she's ambitious... but aren't we all?"

Rod Liddle, who was allegedly hit by Silverton in 2003, nevertheless defended his former co-presenter. Liddle said: "Kate is intelligent, attractive and has strong opinions. She was absolutely lovely, good fun, professional, intelligent and devoid of the usual afflictions of TV presenters – narcissism and greed."

Personal life 
Kate married Mike Heron in 2010. On 5 November 2011, Silverton gave birth to a baby girl. Her baby daughter was eventually conceived naturally, after four unsuccessful cycles of IVF. After losing an ovary during an operation to remove a cyst at the age of 29, Silverton had been told that she was unlikely to get pregnant naturally.

On 25 January 2014, at the age of 43, Silverton announced that she was pregnant with her second child. She used her Twitter account to break the news, stating: "Mike and I are very happy to share that Clemency is set to become a big sister this summer." Their second child, a son, was born on 26 June 2014.

Silverton is 5 ft 11in tall. In August 2018, she said the producers of Strictly Come Dancing had custom-made shoes created for her because none in the Strictly wardrobe were big enough for her above-average size nine feet.

Cosmetic surgery lawsuit 
In January 2008, Silverton sued a clinic after an allegedly botched cosmetic surgery procedure for treatment of acne scars. Silverton said that the procedure caused a severe skin reaction and she had to take two weeks off work after the treatment. The lawsuit filed for unspecified monetary damages.

Bibliography 
 Kate Silverton, There's no such thing as 'naughty'. Little, Brown. Boston, Mass., 27 April 2021.

References

External links 
 
 
 BBC profile
 Report to announce new 2000 bulletin

1970 births
BBC newsreaders and journalists
ITV regional newsreaders and journalists
British television presenters
English television journalists
English women journalists
Living people
People from Waltham Abbey, Essex
British women television journalists
British women radio presenters
British women television presenters
Alumni of St Cuthbert's Society, Durham